Thirumal Perumai is a 1968 Indian Tamil-language Hindu mythological film, directed by A. P. Nagarajan. The film stars Sivaji Ganesan and Padmini. It was released on 16 February 1968.

Plot 
Thirumal Perumai tells three spell-binding stories about how far you can get with Lord Vishnu's grace, and how he can solve problems.

Andal
Goddess Lakshmi had been reincarnated on earth as the daughter of a devotee. She was named Kothai.

As she grew up, she learnt about Krishna and loved him. Once, she wore the Lord's garland. Just as she was admiring herself – her father caught her and slapped her. After much crying, she promised never to wear the Lord's garland again. The devotee did service to Lord Vishnu and put the garland on him. To his surprise, it fell off.

The devotee learnt that Lord Vishnu only liked garlands that had been worn by Kothai. Kothai comes in with the previous garland and then they garland Lord Vishnu.

The story ends with Kothai merging with Lord Vishnu.

The Thief
There is a king, who makes one of his men a king of a city. He then gives his daughter in marriage to the new king. The new king is engrossed in war. His wife makes him change his views and he begins building a temple. Gradually he is reduced to the state of robbing to get money for God's temple. Once he comes across a wedding couple. He takes all their jewels and then looks at the groom's toe ring. He cannot remove it. The groom is actually Lord Vishnu and the bride Goddess Lakshmi. He falls at their feet and then accompanies the lord to his abode.

The Dancer
There is a dancer who goes to see a sage. Then she vows to make him her slave. Finally the sage falls in love with her and then the dancer goes to visit her mother. While she is at the temple the sage arrives. The mother is disgusted seeing that he is not rich. Finally Lord Vishnu takes the temple deity's jewels in a pot to the mother and she welcomes the sage. The sage is accused of stealing, and just before he is going to be killed, Lord Vishnu comes and saves the day.

Cast 

 Sivaji Ganesan as  Periyalvar, Thirumangai Alwar, Thondaradi podi Alwar (Vibranarayanar).
 Sivakumar... Vishnu
 Sowcar Janaki... Kumuthavalli
 Padmini... Devadevi
 K. R. Vijaya... Andal
 Kutty Padmini... Younger Kodhai or Andal
Rajasulochana... Devi, Dancer's sister
 S. N. Lakshmi... Dancer's Mother
 M. Bhanumathi as Goddess Lakshmi

Cameo Appearance:

 Nagesh... Raman
 M. N. Nambiar...  Chola King
E. R. Sahadevan.... Chola King
 T. R. Ramachandran... Ranga Thondaradi Podi Alwar Student
 Manorama
G. Sakunthala...Yasodha
P. D. Sambandam
 S. Ramarao
 A. Karunanidhi as Nattamai
 T. P. Muthulakshmi as Nattamai's wife
 K. R. Devaki
 Master Prabhakar as little Krishna

Soundtrack 
The music was composed by K. V. Mahadevan. The song "Thirumal Perumaikku" is a ragamalika that begins with Madhyamavati raga, followed by Dhanyasi, Mohanam, Kaanada, Saranga, Khamas, Paras, Saramathi, Surutti and Begada, ending with Madhyamavathi again. "Kakkai Chiraginiley" is based on Subramania Bharati's song of the same name.

References

External links 
 

1960s Tamil-language films
1968 films
Films directed by A. P. Nagarajan
Films scored by K. V. Mahadevan
Films with screenplays by A. P. Nagarajan
Hindu devotional films
Hindu mythological films